is a Japanese direct-to-video horror film released in 1989 by the Bandai Media Division (now Bandai Visual). It was the first film co-directed by Go Nagai along with Hikari Hayakawa. It features special appearances of other manga artists such as Chiaki Kawamata. The film has a sequel called Nagai Go no Kowai Zone 2: Senki.

External links
Nagai Go no Kowai Zone: Kaiki at allcinema
Nagai Go no Kowai Zone: Kaiki  at the Japanese Movie Database

1989 horror films
Go Nagai
1980s Japanese-language films
1989 films
1980s Japanese films